Yair is a Hebrew given name. Jair is a variant. It may also be used as a surname. It may refer to:

Given name
 Jair or Yair, the father of Mordecai
Yair Bacharach (1639—1702) – Rabbi in Germany
Yair Davidovitz (born 1945), Israeli Olympic sport shooter
Yair Golan (born 1962), Israeli politician and former general in the Israel Defense Forces 
Yair Kless (born 1940), Israeli violinist and professor
Yair Lapid (born 1963), Israeli politician
 Yair Lotan (born 1973), actor
Yair Michaeli (born 1944), Israeli Olympic competitive sailor
Yair Netanyahu (born 1991), son of the current Israeli prime minister Benjamin Netanyahu
Yair Nossovsky (born 1937), Israeli footballer
 Yair Pantilat (born 1939), Israeli Olympic runner
Yair Rodriguez (born 1992), Mexican mixed martial artist
Yair Rosenblum (1944–1996), Israeli composer
Yair Sprinzak (1911–1999) – Israeli scientist and Member of Knesset
Yair Tauman, Israeli professor and businessman
Yair Tzaban (born 1930), Israeli politician
Yair Wertheimer (born 1955), Israeli tennis player

Other
Avraham Stern (1907–1942), alias Yair, a leader of Lehi

See also
Yahir, Mexican singer
Ben Yair (surname)
Jair (name)
Jairus (disambiguation)